Rinorea deflexa is a species of plant in the Violaceae family. It is endemic to Ecuador.  Its natural habitat is subtropical or tropical dry forests.

References

deflexa
Endemic flora of Ecuador
Endangered plants
Taxonomy articles created by Polbot